Schmidt Island is one of the islands of the Severnaya Zemlya group in the Russian Arctic and was named after Soviet scientist and first head of the Chief Directorate of the Northern Sea Route, Otto Schmidt. It is located at the far northwestern end of the archipelago and lies slightly south of the Arctic Cape on Komsomolets Island.

Geography
Schmidt Island is significantly detached from the rest of Severnaya Zemlya regarding the relative proximity of the other main islands to each other.

It measures  and is almost entirely covered by the Schmidt Ice Cap. Owing to its exposed position, the climate in the Schmidt Island's area is much colder than in the rest of the archipelago.

See also
 List of glaciers of Russia
 List of islands of Russia

References

External links
 

Islands of the Kara Sea
Islands of Severnaya Zemlya